"Best Thing Since Backroads" is a song by American country music singer Jake Owen. It was released on August 6, 2021 as the lead single from his forthcoming seventh studio album. The song was written by Ben Johnson, Geoff Warburton, Hunter Phelps, and Jordan Minton, and produced by Joey Moi.

Background and content
Shelby Scott of Outsider wrote that the song describes "the subject’s long time spent traveling his town’s back roads." Carena Liptak of ABC Audio said it [is] "about  the breezy, simple pleasure of driving two-lane highways — and the equally euphoric feeling of finding true love." In a press release, Owen stated: "It's always exciting releasing new music. It feels great being back out on the road and bringing happiness to people."

Critical reception
Billy Dukes of Taste of Country felt that fans listening to "Best Thing Since Backroads" "may recall songs from the previous decade. Familiar scenes of lovemaking by the riverbank and dirt road drives with a cooler in the back dotted many of Moi's best arrangements in the early 2010s."

Charts

Weekly charts

Year-end charts

References

2021 singles
2021 songs
Jake Owen songs
Songs written by Geoff Warburton
Song recordings produced by Joey Moi
Big Loud singles